North Kansas City School District 74 or NKC Schools is a school district headquartered in Kansas City, Missouri.

The Harlem School District 72 and Glenwood School District 73 merged into the NKC Schools district on March 4, 1913. Its first school, Kenneth School, opened in summer 1913.

Attendance boundary
Located mostly in Clay County, the district serves sections of Kansas City. It also serves all of the following: North Kansas City, Avondale, Birmingham, Claycomo, Gladstone, Oaks,  Oakview, Oakwood, Oakwood Park, Pleasant Valley, and Randolph. Small portions of Independence and Liberty are in the district boundaries. Small portions of the district are in Platte County, and these portions include sections of Kansas City.

Schools
High schools:
 North Kansas City High School
 Oak Park High School
 Staley High School
 Winnetonka High School

Middle schools:
 Antioch Middle School
 Maple Park Middle School
 New Mark Middle School
 Northgate Middle School

6th Grade:
 Eastgate 6th Grade Center
 Gateway 6th Grade Center

Elementary schools:
 Bell Prairie Elementary School
 Briarcliff Elementary School
 Chapel Hill Elementary School
 Choteau Elementary School
 Clardy Elementary School
 Crestview Elementary School
 Davidson Elementary School
 Fox Hill Elementary School
 Gashland Elementary School
 Gracemor Elementary School
 Lakewood Elementary School
 Linden West Elementary School
 Maplewood Elementary School
 Meadowbrook Elementary School
 Nashua Elementary School
 Northview Elementary School
 Oakwood Manor Elementary School
 Ravenwood Elementary School
 Rising Hill Elementary School
 Topping Elementary School
 West Englewood Elementary School
 Winnwood Elementary School

Preschool:
 Early Childhood Special Education Center (ESCE)

Alternative:
 Students in Academically Gifted Education (SAGE) Center
Golden Oaks Education Center
Joseph G. Jacobs III Education Center

Mascots 

 North Kansas City High School Hornets
 Oak Park High School Northmen
 Staley High School Falcons
 Winnetonka High School Griffins
 Antioch Middle School Spartans
 Maple Park Middle School Vikings
 New Mark Middle School Northstars
 Northgate Middle School  Gators
 Eastgate 6th Grade Center Eagles
 Gateway 6th Grade Center Grizzlies
 Bell Prairie Elementary School Mustangs
 Briarcliff Elementary School Bears
 Chapel Hill Elementary School Bobcats
 Choteau Elementary School Dragons
 Clardy Elementary School Wildcats
 Crestview Elementary School Cheetahs
 Davidson Elementary School Comets
 Fox Hill Elementary School Foxes
 Gashland Elementary School Stars
 Gracemor Elementary School Crusaders
 Lakewood Elementary School Leopards
 Linden West Elementary School Cougars
 Maplewood Elementary School Cougars
 Meadowbrook Elementary School Roadrunners
 Nashua Elementary School Stars
 Northview Elementary School Panthers
 Oakwood Manor Elementary School Owls
 Ravenwood Elementary School Ravens
 Rising Hill Elementary School Explorers
 Topping Elementary School Bulldogs
 West Englewood Elementary School Eagles
 Winnwood Elementary School Wildcats
 Students in Academically Gifted Education (SAGE) Center Illuminators
 Golden Oaks Education Center Bulldogs
 Joseph G. Jacobs III Education Center Bulldogs

References

External links
 
School districts in Missouri
Education in Clay County, Missouri
Education in Platte County, Missouri
1913 establishments in Missouri
Education in Kansas City, Missouri
School districts established in 1913